James Barney Marsh (April 12, 1856June 26, 1936) was an American engineer and bridge designer. He patented a new design for arch bridges. Marsh gave Archie Alexander, the first African-American to graduate as an engineer from Iowa State University, his first job. Marsh worked in the bridge building business for over 50 years, and several of his bridges are listed in the National Register of Historic Places.

Personal life and early career
Marsh was born on April 12, 1856, in North Lake, Wisconsin. He moved to Iowa sometime around 1877, later enrolling at Iowa State University, and he received a Bachelor of Mechanical Engineering in 1882. Within the next year, he traveled to Des Moines, Iowa, to work as a contracting agent for the King Bridge Company of Cleveland, Ohio. He married and had three children.

Later career
Marsh was the representative of King Bridge Company in 1883 and the Kansas City Bridge and Iron Company in 1886. In 1889, Marsh became the western general agent for the King Bridge Company. Marsh had already had many bridges completed in Iowa, including a three-mile railroad structure in Sioux City and three bridges in Des Moines. His other bridges were in Montana, South Dakota, Minnesota, and Colorado. He became an independent bridge designer and contractor in 1896, but he still had his prior contacts with bridge companies to receive materials. Within a few years after the introduction of a new type of bridge construction involving reinforced concrete, Marsh worked on applying reinforced concrete to urban bridges. In 1901, he was an engineer of a Melan arch bridge in Waterloo, Iowa, which finished construction in 1903. Marsh wrote about reinforced concrete girder bridges, which were published in works by the International Engineering Congress in St. Louis in 1904.

Throughout the first decade of the 1900s, Marsh built more bridges that were made out of reinforced concrete and steel. His company was named the Marsh Bridge Company, and it provided bridges to cities and rural areas. The bridges included a reinforced concrete wagon bridge in Greene County and Melan bridge in Cedar Rapids. In the beginning of 1909, the Marsh Bridge Company was taken over by someone else, and the Marsh Engineering Company was started soon after. In May 1909, a Melan arch bridge in Peoria, Illinois collapsed and Engineering News said that the collapse was "the largest recorded failure of a reinforced-concrete bridge". The bridge collapse was likely caused by someone removing protective sheet piling without authorization. In November 1909, Marsh's new company finished building an arch bridge in Dunkerton, Iowa.

The Melan bridges that were built by Marsh and others required royalties to be paid to the American holders of the patent. The added cost of paying royalties made the cost of building such bridges with reinforced concrete very high. Marsh did not want to pay the royalties, so he built his own design for a reinforced concrete highway bridge, which later became known as the Marsh Rainbow Arch. His rainbow arch bridges were designed to be built without any supporting scaffolding. On August 12, 1912, Marsh received a patent for the design. The design used less labor, and it used a lesser amount of concrete. Steel that would be used for reinforcing bridges was cheap. Marsh's patented work allowed rural townships to have bridges that resembled the ones used over rivers in bigger cities. The patent was described as being "to construct an arch bridge of reinforced concrete in such a manner as to permit a limited amount of expansion and contraction both of the arches and of the floor".

Marsh continued to building rainbow arches and other types of reinforced concrete arch bridges. Possibly the largest rainbow arch bridge that he built was the Cotter Bridge in Arkansas, which was completed in 1930. He collaborated with other engineers to create "Minimum Specifications for Highway Bridges" for the Iowa Engineering Society, which was completed in 1914. Marsh's son, Frank E. Marsh, owned a construction company that often received the contracts for building bridges that were designed by Marsh. Marsh gave Archie Alexander, the first African-American to graduate as an engineer from the University of Iowa, his start. Alexander worked under Marsh for two years and later built his own projects nationwide. Marsh was a bridge builder for over fifty years.

Death and legacy
Several of Marsh's bridges remain and are listed in the National Register of Historic Places (NRHP). Marsh died on June 26, 1936.

Works
Notable works include:

Iowa
All Iowa works are NRHP-listed.

Beaver Creek Bridge, M Avenue over Beaver Creek, Perry
Beaver Creek Bridge, 210th Street over Beaver Creek, Ogden
Big Creek Bridge 2, 2130 320th Street over Big Creek, Madrid
Court Avenue Bridge, Court Avenue over Des Moines River, Des Moines
Des Moines River Bridge, CR P14 over East Fork of Des Moines River, Swea City
Marsh Rainbow Arch Bridge, Highway N37 over North Raccoon River, Lake City
Rockwell City Bridge, 270th Street over unnamed stream, Rockwell City
Squaw Creek Bridge, 120th Street and V Avenue over Squaw Creek, Ridgeport
Squaw Creek Bridge 2, 110th Street and V Avenue over Squaw Creek, Ridgeport

Kansas
Blacksmith Creek Bridge, west of Topeka, NRHP-listed
Brush Creek Bridge, north of Baxter Springs, NRHP-listed
Cedar Creek Bridge, FAS 96, Elgin, NRHP-listed
Conroe Bridge, east of Junction City, NRHP-listed
Creamery Bridge, Osawatomie, NRHP-listed
Dewlen-Spohnhauer Bridge, Old US 160, Independence, NRHP-listed
Mack (John) Bridge, South Broadway across the Big Arkansas River, Wichita, NRHP-listed
Mine Creek Bridge, east of Mound City, NRHP-listed
Neosho River Bridge, east of Hartford, NRHP-listed
Pottawatomie Creek Bridge, Osawatomie, NRHP-listed
Soden's Grove Bridge, K-57/99, Emporia, NRHP-listed

Elsewhere
Bladensburg Concrete Bowstring Bridge, SR 541 over Wakatomika Creek, Bladensburg, Ohio, documented by HAER
 Cotter Bridge, US 62 BUS over the White River in Cotter, Arkansas.
Miller Ree Creek Bridge, west edge of Miller, South Dakota, NRHP-listed
Marsh Rainbow Arch Bridge, Spring Street, Chippewa Falls, Wisconsin, NRHP-listed

See also
Brush Creek Bridge – Last Marsh arch bridge on Route 66

References

Further reading 
 John Mack Bridge – James B Marsh bio included
 Valley City Times Record – Article containing bio info
 
 
 James Barney Marsh II narrative

External links
 Cotter Bridge – Six-span rainbow arch bridge

1856 births
1936 deaths
American bridge engineers
Concrete pioneers
Engineers from Wisconsin
People from Merton, Wisconsin
Iowa State University alumni